Sankiniana is a town in the Faranah Region of Guinea.

Populated places in the Faranah Region